Ostuacán is a town and one of the 119 Municipalities of Chiapas, in southern Mexico.

In 2010, the municipality had a total population of 17,067, up from 17,026 in 2005. It covers an area of 946.4 km².

In 2010, the town of Ostuacán had a population of 2,979. Other than the town of Ostuacán, the municipality had 111 localities, the largest of which (with 2010 populations in parentheses) were: Nuevo Juan del Grijalva (1,598), Plan de Ayala (1,463), and Nuevo Xochimilco (1,393), classified as rural.

References

Municipalities of Chiapas